Cheneya irrufata is a moth in the Bombycidae family. It was described by Paul Dognin in 1911. It is found in Colombia.

References

Natural History Museum Lepidoptera generic names catalog

Bombycidae
Moths described in 1911